Terry Hie Hie is a very small farming town in the north of New South Wales, Australia within the Moree Plains Shire Council.  Terry Hie Hie is south of the Gwydir Highway, east of the Newell Highway and 47 km south-east of Moree, the nearest large town.

Tycannah Creek also flows through the village of Terry Hie Hie. In times of flood, Tycannah Creek has been known to inundate some houses. This last happened during the November 2011 floods and the February 2012 floods. In February 2012 floods 12 people were ordered to evacuate from their homes during a large downpour in the Tycannah Creek catchment.

Local Aboriginal groups and conservationists were petitioning as recently as 2005 for a 160 square kilometre national park to be set aside and added to the schedule of Aboriginal ownership.  The park would comprise seven existing State forests and one existing nature reserve.  Logging ceased in the Mission State Forest during 2004. The area is seen as "the last big bit of bush that Aboriginal people can connect with in the Moree area".

See also 
 List of reduplicated Australian place names

References

External links 
 Media Release 24 February 2005  from "Terry Hie Hie Traditional Owners"  and "Western Conservation Alliance"
 ABC news story on the anti-logging protests in February 2004

Towns in New South Wales
Indigenous Australian politics
Moree Plains Shire